Bembidion lunatum is a species of ground beetle native to Europe.

References

lunatum
Beetles described in 1812
Beetles of Europe